Adam Paul Barton (born May 1995) is an English cricketer. He made his first-class debut on 7 April 2014 for Cambridge MCCU against Essex.

References

External links
 
 

1995 births
Living people
Alumni of Anglia Ruskin University
Cambridge MCCU cricketers
Cricketers from Surrey
English cricketers
Sussex cricketers